Veronica van Dyk (born 1 January 1968) is a South African politician who has served as a Member of the National Assembly since May 2014. A member of the Democratic Alliance, she is party's deputy shadow minister of sports, arts and culture. Van Dyk served as a ward councillor of the Nama Khoi Local Municipality from 2011 to 2014.

Career
Van Dyk founded a monthly newspaper called Namakwa Kletz and presented a local radio show in the Namaqualand. She also headed Daisy Ubuntu Charity, a non-profit organisation.

Van Dyk joined the Democratic Alliance in 2009. She was elected as a ward councillor of the Nama Khoi Local Municipality in the 2011 municipal elections.

Parliamentary career
Van Dyk was nominated to the National Assembly  after the general election on 7 May 2014. She took office as an MP on 21 May 2014. During her first term, she served as a member of the Portfolio Committee on Communications. She was the party's shadow deputy minister of communications.

In May 2019  she was re-elected for a second term. She now serves on the Portfolio Committee on Sports, Arts and Culture. She is also the party's shadow deputy minister for that specific portfolio.

References

External links
Veronica Van Dyk – Public People

Living people
1968 births
Afrikaner people
People from the Northern Cape
Democratic Alliance (South Africa) politicians
Members of the National Assembly of South Africa
Women members of the National Assembly of South Africa
21st-century South African politicians
21st-century South African women politicians